Big Rock Falls is a 150-foot waterfall on Privassion River, in the Mountain Pine Ridge Forest Reserve of the Cayo District of Belize.

References

Waterfalls of Belize